Maung Kyaw Zan (born 17 December  1964) is a Burmese politician  and  currently serves as  an Amyotha Hluttaw MP for Rakhine State  No. 9 Constituency . He is a member of Rakhine National Party.

Early life and education
He was  born on  17 December  1964  in Rathedaung, Rakhine State , Burma(Myanmar). He graduated with B.A(History) from Sittwe University.

Political career
He is a member of the Rakhine National Party. In the Myanmar general election, 2015, he was elected as an Amyotha Hluttaw MP and elected representative from Rakhine State № 9  parliamentary  constituency. He also serves as a member of Amyotha Hluttaw Ethnic Affairs Committee.

References

Arakan National Party politicians
1964 births
Living people
People from Rakhine State
Arakanese politicians